Sparta/Fort McCoy Airport  is a public and military use airport located in Monroe County, Wisconsin, United States, three nautical miles (6 km) northeast of Sparta. The airport is used heavily by the U.S. Army, accounting for 75% of traffic operations, primarily transient military aircraft supporting operations at nearby Fort McCoy, which is a major training facility. It is included in the Federal Aviation Administration (FAA) National Plan of Integrated Airport Systems for 2021–2025, in which it is categorized as a local general aviation facility.

Facilities and aircraft 
Sparta/Fort McCoy Airport covers an area of 640 acres (259 ha) at an elevation of 838 feet (255 m) above mean sea level. It has two runways with asphalt surfaces: 11/29 is 4,697 by 100 feet (1,432 x 30 m) and 1/19 is 3,032 by 95 feet (924 x 29 m). The airport also has two asphalt helipads, on Runway 11/29 and taxiway Charlie, both measuring 100 by 100 feet (30 x 30 m), respectively.

For the 12-month period ending June 22, 2022, the airport had 6,000 aircraft operations, an average of 16 per day: 50% military and 50% general aviation. In January 2023, there were 23 aircraft based at this airport:  22 single-engine and 1 helicopter.

See also 
 List of airports in Wisconsin

References

External links 
  at Wisconsin DOT Airport Directory
 Aerial image as of April 1999 from USGS The National Map
 

Airports in Wisconsin
Buildings and structures in Monroe County, Wisconsin